Paul Wallace (born 2 January 1957) is a South African cricketer. He played in one List A and four first-class matches for Boland in 1980/81.

See also
 List of Boland representative cricketers

References

External links
 

1957 births
Living people
South African cricketers
Boland cricketers
Cricketers from Cape Town